La-La Loco Baby (2008) is an American short action comedy film starring Chris Moir, Satomi Okuno, Ilia Volok and Rene Rivera as "Diesel" and is based on the life of Roberto Vilme known as Baby Lala.

Plot
Mitch, a rookie LA cop is having nightmares and meets Keiko a girl he had believed to be a figment of his dream. An irresistible Japanese naïf and runaway daughter of a Yakuza boss, Keiko reveals surprising skills that save the day. Against all odds, together they ace Mitch's jaded sergeant Diesel, and bring down the erudite though brutal Kazimir, a disillusioned Russian mobster.

References

External links

2008 films
American short films
2000s English-language films